Raynes is a surname. Notable people with the surname include:

Andrew Raynes (born 1973), English bodybuilder
E. Peter Raynes, English engineer
Edward Raynes, British clergyman
John Crawshaw Raynes (1887–1929), English World War I Victoria Cross recipient
Michael Raynes (born 1987), English footballer
Thomas Raynes (1835–1914), English cricketer
William Robert Raynes (1871–1966), English politician

See also
Rayne (surname)
Raines (surname)